Sin-Decade is the fourth studio album by the Danish hard rock/heavy metal band Pretty Maids. It was produced by Flemming Rasmussen and Pretty Maids, and released in 1992 by Columbia Records.

After the relative commercial failure of the band's previous album, Jump the Gun (1990), the bass guitarist Allan Delong, the keyboard player Alan Owen and the drummer Phil More left the group by late 1990, leaving only the singer Ronnie Atkins and the guitarist Ken Hammer. The two remaining members began writing songs for a new album, this time with "full creative control" according to Atkins. Due to the tumultuous situation around the band, Atkins and Hammer wrote "aggressive and heavy" songs. According to Atkins, the band decided to work with the Danish producer Flemming Rasmussen to avoid the "over-produced" sound of Jump the Gun. To complete the band's line-up, Atkins and Hammer recruited drummer Michael Fast and bass guitar player Kenn Jackson.

The album includes the single "Please Don't Leave Me" (a cover version of the John Sykes song) which has become Pretty Maids' signature song. It was later re-recorded in an acoustic version for the band's fifth studio album, Stripped (1993).

Track listing

Personnel
Ronnie Atkins - lead vocals
Ken Hammer - lead guitar
Michael Fast - drums
Kenn Jackson - bass guitar
Alan Owen - keyboards
Dominic Gale - keyboards

Additional musician
Knud Lindhard - backing vocals

References

External links
Pretty Maids website

1992 albums
Pretty Maids albums
Columbia Records albums
Albums produced by Flemming Rasmussen